Sir Sabaratnam Arulkumaran is a Sri Lankan Tamil physician, former president of the Royal College of Obstetricians and Gynaecologists and the International Federation of Gynaecology and Obstetrics, and president-elect of the British Medical Association.

Early life and family
Arulkumaran was born in 1948. He was the son of K. Sabaratnam, a Director of the Jaffna Co-operative Society, and Gnambikai. He was from Kantharmadam in northern Ceylon. He was educated at Jaffna Central College and Mahajana College, Tellippalai. After school he joined the University of Ceylon in 1968 and graduated with an honours MBBS degree in 1972. He then obtained a Diploma in Child Health from the university. He then entered the National University of Singapore from where he obtained MD and PhD degrees. He then became a fellow of the Royal College of Obstetricians and Gynaecologists and the Royal College of Surgeons of Edinburgh.

Career
Arulkumaran joined the National University of Singapore in 1982 as a lecturer. He was professor of obstetrics and gynaecology (1993-1997) and head of the Department of Obstetrics and Gynaecology (1995-1997). Whilst working in Singapore, Arulkumaran also carried out research in the United States, Sweden, and France.

Arulkumaran moved to the United Kingdom in 1997 to be closer to other family members. Here, he was professor of obstetrics and gynaecology at the University of Nottingham (1997-2001) and non-executive director of the Southern Derbyshire Acute Hospital NHS Trust (1997-2001). Arulkumaran was professor and head of obstetrics and gynaecology at St George's, University of London from 2001 to 2013.

Arulkumaran was treasurer of the International Federation of Gynaecology and Obstetrics (1997-2003), its secretary-general (2003-2006) and is its president since 2012. He served as vice-president of the Royal College of Obstetricians and Gynaecologists before serving as its president from 2007 to 2010. In June 2012, he was elected president of the British Medical Association for 2013-2014.

Arulkumaran is an honorary fellow of the American Congress of Obstetricians and Gynecologists, Federation of Obstetric and Gynaecological Societies of India, Royal Australian and New Zealand College of Obstetricians and Gynaecologists, Society of Obstetricians and Gynaecologists of Pakistan, South African Society of Obstetricians and Gynaecologists, and Sri Lanka College of Obstetricians and Gynaecologists. He is an honorary member of the Deutsche Gesellschaft für Gynäkilogie und Geurtshilfe, Obstetrical and Gynaecological Society of Malaysia and Society of Obstetricians and Gynaecologists of Canada. He has also received an honorary doctorate from the University of Athens.

Arulkumaran has been editor-in-chief of Best Practices and Research in Clinical Obstetrics and Gynaecology since 1998. He has written or edited 24 books, 240 articles, and more than 150 book chapters. He was appointed Knight Bachelor in June 2009 for his services to medicine.

In November 2012, Arulkumaran was appointed chair of a panel of inquiry into the death of Savita Halappanavar in Ireland.

References

1948 births
Academics of the University of Nottingham
Alumni of Jaffna Central College
Alumni of Mahajana College, Tellippalai
Alumni of the University of Ceylon (Peradeniya)
British people of Sri Lankan Tamil descent
Knights Bachelor
Living people
National University of Singapore alumni
Academic staff of the National University of Singapore
Academics of St George's, University of London
People from Northern Province, Sri Lanka
Sri Lankan Tamil physicians
Fellows of the Royal College of Obstetricians and Gynaecologists
Fellows of the Royal College of Surgeons of Edinburgh
Members of the National Academy of Medicine